Spiral Staircase – Classic Songs is a double CD compilation of tracks from Ralph McTell's early Transatlantic LPs Eight Frames a Second, Spiral Staircase, My Side of Your Window and Revisited. It was released in 1997.

Track listing 

All titles by Ralph McTell except where stated.

Disc 1    
"Summer Come Along"
"Terminus"
"Michael in the Garden" [Version 2]
"Nanna's Song"
"Last Train and Ride"
"Wino and the Mouse"
"Clown"
"Willoughby's Farm"
"The Mermaid and the Seagull"
"Eight Frames a Second"
"Wait Until the Snow"
"Hesitation Blues" (Trad. arr. Ralph McTell)
"England 1914"
"Girl on a Bicycle" (Ralph McTell/Gary Petersen)
"Mrs. Adlam's Angels"
"Granny Takes a Trip" (Boyer/Beard)
"Blind Blake's Rag" (Trad. arr. Ralph McTell)
"Spiral Staircase"
"Father Forgive Them" [Version 1]
"All Things Change"
"Streets of London"

Disc 2    
"Factory Girl" [Version 2]
"Bright and Beautiful Things"
"Father Forgive Them" [Version 2]
"Michael in the Garden" [Version 1]
"I've Thought About It"
"Blues in More Than 12 Bars"
"Rizraklaru (Anag)"
"Factory Girl" [Version 1]
"Silver Birch and Weeping Willow"
"Louise"
"Too Tight Drag" (Blind Blake)
"Kew Gardens"
"Fairground"
"Sleepy Time Blues"
"Daddy's Here"
"Morning Dew" (Bonnie Dobson arr. Fred Neil)
"I'm Sorry - I Must Leave"

Note.  Titles marked '[Version 1]' are from the original albums; those marked '[Version 2]' are re-mixes from Revisited.

Musical credits
Ralph McTell - guitar, vocals
For other musicians see Eight Frames a Second, Spiral Staircase and My Side of Your Window.

Production credits
See the articles on the contributing albums Eight Frames a Second, Spiral Staircase, My Side of Your Window and Revisited.

References

Ralph McTell albums
Albums produced by Gus Dudgeon
1997 compilation albums
Snapper Music compilation albums